Bill Griffeth is an author and retired TV news anchor.

Early life and education
In 1980, Griffeth received a bachelor's degree in journalism from California State University, Northridge. While a student there, Griffeth co-hosted a weekly interview show, "Straightalk," with Rick Holicker, on KCSN, the university's then-NPR-affiliated radio station. Along with Holicker, he won the Golden Mike Award from the Radio & Television News Association of Southern California for a documentary on NASA's Viking program, titled "The Flight to Mars." In 2000, CSUN honored him with its Distinguished Alumnus Award. In 2017, he received an honorary doctorate.

Career
Griffeth was part of the production team that started the Financial News Network in 1981. He was nominated for a CableACE award as best news anchor for his work anchoring FNN's coverage of Black Monday (1987).

Griffeth joined CNBC in 1991, when NBC purchased FNN and merged it with CNBC. He anchored several programs for CNBC and received 6 CableACE nominations as Best News Anchor.

CNBC announced on December 12, 2019 that he was retiring after almost 30 years with the network.

Personal life
Griffeth is passionate about genealogy and after undergoing genetic testing in 2012, found out that the person he considered his father was not his biological father.

In 1982, he married his wife, Cindy. Since 1992, they have been residents of Park Ridge, New Jersey. They have a son, Chad, and a daughter, Carlee. Bill is a member of and teaches bible study at The Hillsdale United Methodist Church.

Host shows
Nightly Business Report (2018–2019)
Closing Bell (2011–2018)
Power Lunch (1996–2009)
The Edge (1999-March 2000)
Market Wrap (1991–2002)
Strictly Business
The Money Club

Bibliography

References

External links
 

1956 births
Living people
American reporters and correspondents
American television journalists
American business and financial journalists
California State University, Northridge alumni
CNBC people
Writers from Los Angeles
American business writers
American male journalists
People from Park Ridge, New Jersey